Khalida Shchegoleyeva (born 1933) is a former Soviet female speed skater. She won a gold medal at the World Allround Speed Skating Championships for Women in 1953.

References

1933 births
Living people
Soviet female speed skaters
World Allround Speed Skating Championships medalists
Honoured Masters of Sport of the USSR